Rory James Lonergan (born 1 June 1999) is an English professional footballer who currently plays as a left back for Hong Kong Premier League club HKFC.

Career statistics

Club

Notes

References

External links
 Yau Yee Football League profile

Living people
1999 births
English people of Irish descent
English footballers
Republic of Ireland association footballers
Association football defenders
Hong Kong First Division League players
Hong Kong FC players
English expatriate footballers
English expatriate sportspeople in Hong Kong
Republic of Ireland expatriate association footballers
Irish expatriate sportspeople in Hong Kong
Expatriate footballers in Hong Kong
People educated at Island School
Alumni of Durham University